Events from the year 1873 in art.

Events
 Early – Pre-Raphaelite painter Simeon Solomon is arrested in a public urinal in London and convicted and fined for gross indecency.
 May – Vincent van Gogh is re-located to London by his employer, the art dealers Goupil & Cie.
 World exhibition in Vienna.
 Monet, Renoir, Pissarro, and Sisley organize the Société Anonyme Coopérative des Artistes Peintres, Sculpteurs, Graveurs, etc. for the purpose of exhibiting artworks independently.
 The collection forming the Galleria Nazionale dell'Umbria is moved to the Palazzo dei Priori, Perugia.
 New Accademia delle Arti del Disegno established in Florence.
 Leslie Ward, as "Spy", begins producing caricatures for the British magazine Vanity Fair.
 Michelangelo's statue of David is removed from the Piazza della Signoria in Florence to the Galleria dell'Accademia.

Works

 William-Adolphe Bouguereau – Nymphs and Satyr
 Edward Burne-Jones – Love Among the Ruins (original watercolour version)
 Alexandre Cabanel – La Comtesse de Keller
 Gustave Caillebotte – Nude woman lying on a couch
 Philip Hermogenes Calderon – Letter From Daddy
 Walter Crane – Shelley's Tomb in the Protestant Cemetery in Rome
 Alphonse-Marie-Adolphe de Neuville – The Last Cartridges (Les dernières cartouches)
 Edgar Degas – A Cotton Office in New Orleans
 Hans Gude – Nødhavn Ved Norskekysten
 Winslow Homer – The Boat Builders
 William Holman Hunt – The Shadow of Death
 Rudolf Koller – Gotthardpost
 Ivan Kramskoi
 Ivan Shishkin
 Leo Tolstoy
 Édouard Manet
 Le Bon Bock ("The Good Pint") (Philadelphia Museum of Art)
 The Railway ("The Gare Saint-Lazare") (National Gallery of Art, Washington, D.C.)
 Jan Matejko – Astronomer Copernicus, or Conversations with God
 Pál Szinyei Merse – Picnic in May (National Gallery of Hungary, Budapest)
 Claude Monet
 The Artist's House at Argenteuil
 Camille Monet on a Garden Bench
 Poppies Blooming
 Albert Joseph Moore – Follow-my-Leader
 Camille Pissarro – Self-portrait
 Ilya Repin – Barge Haulers on the Volga
 John Roddam Spencer Stanhope – The Gentle Music of a Bygone Day
 Heinrich Strack – Berlin Victory Column
 James McNeill Whistler – Arrangement in Grey and Black, No. 2: Portrait of Thomas Carlyle

Births
 January 28 – Charles Sims, English painter (suicide 1928)
 February 14 – Albert Guillaume, French painter and caricaturist (died 1942)
 March 13 – Léon Delagrange, French sculptor and aviator (died 1910)
 April 3 – Rista Vukanović, Serbian Impressionist painter and husband of painter Beta Vukanović (died 1918)
 April 4 – Élie Faure, French art historian (died 1937)
 April 24 – André Bauchant, French painter (died 1958)
 May 10 – Carl Eldh, Swedish painter and sculptor (died 1954)
 July 6 – Ethel Sands, American-born painter (died 1962)
 July 7 – Albert Moulton Foweraker, English painter (died 1942)
 October 12 – Nadežda Petrović, Serbian Fauvist painter (died 1915)
 December 5 – Julian Smith Australian surgeon and photographer was born in England (died 1947)
 date unknown – Jane Emmet de Glehn, American painter (died 1961)
 approximate date – Olowe of Ise, Yoruba wood sculptor (died c. 1938)

Deaths
 March 25 – Wilhelm Marstrand, Danish painter (born 1810)
 April 17 – Fyodor Petrovich Tolstoy, Russian painter, engraver and silhouettist (born 1783)
 April 28 – Giovanni Maria Benzoni, Italian sculptor (born 1809)
 May 13 – Konstantin Danil, renowned Serbian painter (born 1798)
 May 19 – Charles Lucy, English painter (born 1814)
 July 8 – Franz Xaver Winterhalter, German painter (born 1805)
 October 2 – Cornelius Varley, English watercolor painter (born 1881)
 October 9 – John Evan Thomas, Welsh sculptor (born 1810)
 November 25 – Hans Harder, Danish painter and drawing master (born 1792)
 November 27 – Edmund Thomas Parris, English historical, portrait, subject, and panorama painter, book illustrator, designer and art restorer (born 1793)
 December 9 – William Bent Berczy, painter and political figure in Upper Canada (born 1791)
 date unknown
 Nikola Aleksić, Serbian portraitist in both the Biedermeier and Nazarene movement (born 1808)
 Thomas Frank Heaphy, English miniature painter (born 1813)
 Ignatius Josephus van Regemorter, Flemish historical, landscape, and genre painter and engraver (born 1785)

References

 
Years of the 19th century in art
1870s in art